Dr. Anthony Gates is a fictional character on the television series ER, portrayed by actor John Stamos. Dr. Gates was first introduced in Season 12, before becoming a series regular in Seasons 13-15.

Paramedic appearances 
Actor John Stamos was not available for an extended stint on the show during Season 12, thus, the character of Dr. Gates was written as a paramedic. In Dr. Gates' first appearance in the series, his paramedic was shot at while trying to assist a young kidnapping victim. Dr. Gates transported the girl to County General following the arrest of her kidnapper. While assisting in the treatment of the girl, Gates meets Dr. Neela Rasgotra, who initially seems irritated by Dr. Gates, but the two soon develop a friendship. Dr. Gates later reveals to Dr. Rasgotra that he is actually a medical student who is spending time with the paramedics until he graduates. In the episode, "Two Ships," when two airplanes collided and crashed in downtown Chicago, Dr. Gates and Dr. Rasgotra again worked together, this time out in the field. Dr. Gates was badly injured when he ran into a burning building to save a woman before the building exploded. Dr. Rasgotra was forced to perform a risky liver surgery on him in the field; however, Dr. Gates eventually recovered.

Hospital life 
Stamos reprised his role as Gates at the start of season 13. His strong-willed and often rebellious attitude led him to a few confrontations with attending Gregory Pratt who on many occasions called him a "cowboy"; this provided an ironic counterpoint to Pratt's earlier similar difficulties with Luka Kovač and John Carter. Tony reunited with Neela and had his feelings for her rekindled. The two bickered with one another but eventually had a fling. This began to upset Ray Barnett, who also had feelings for Neela but could never quite face up to them.

It was revealed that Tony had a girlfriend named Meg who was using her deceased husband's life insurance money to get him through medical school. She also had a daughter named Sarah, who loved Tony more as a best friend than a father figure. Tony and Meg's relationship was revealed at first as being casual friends through Meg's husband, who was friends with Tony from their service in the first Gulf War. After the husband's death, Tony decided to live with Meg and her daughter to help them out. Tony would eventually become intimate with Meg. Meg clearly had high hopes for Tony to provide more for her family. Tony didn't mention his domestic status at the hospital, and even Neela was unaware of it.

Tony was caught in the act with Neela when they spent Thanksgiving together at his and Meg's place.  Meg became jealous and angry and tried to get back at Tony and Neela. Ultimately, Tony left Meg for Neela but still managed to stay in Sarah's life.

In "Murmurs of the Heart", Tony gets a frantic call from Sarah saying her mother was unconscious. Despite everyone's best efforts, Meg eventually died from an intentional overdose of medication, leaving Tony flooded with guilt and holding Sarah by his side. The last thing Meg said to Tony before she lost consciousness was that Sarah "is yours", implying that Tony was her biological father. However, a paternity test revealed that this was not the case.

More of Gates's life is exposed when he allows his father, an alcoholic ex-fireman played by Stacy Keach, to move in with him and Sarah. Tony later throws his father out after finding out his father drove Sarah to the movies while drunk. His father protested until the two got into a fistfight, during which Tony justified kicking his father out by explaining that as a fire captain he had caused a young fireman's death because of a mistake he made while drunk. Tony begins thinking about legal intervention after speaking with his lawyer about Sarah, who wants to stay with him regardless of her grandparents' wishes. However, at the end of the season, Meg's parents show up with legal documents and take Sarah without talking to Tony, saying this will make for an easier transition. Tony hopelessly tries to fight back but assures Sarah, he will visit her as much as he can. A cheated-out Tony plans to fight for the custody of Sarah.

Throughout the season, Tony tries to define his troubling relationship with Neela, which is increasingly strained with Ray Barnett still longing for her. At Luka and Abby's wedding, Tony and Ray break out in a fight, drunk over the bar and over their growing hatred of one another. This led to Neela finally breaking up with Gates, as she was in the process of choosing Ray over him. He later tries to reconcile things with Neela, just hoping to stay as friends. At an anti-war rally Neela attends, an explosion breaks, out sending the crowd into mass panic. Tony who was making his way through the crowd to Neela, desperately tries to get through the stampede to save her from being trampled. Gates also loudly castigated and slapped around the jerk who caused the stampede, causing an angry Dr. Moretti to banish Gates from the ER to the ICU. Later, the grandfather of a young girl who died from injuries sustained during the stampede strangled the jerk to death, having realized who he was as a result of Gates's actions. Though Gates initially was viewed as an ER reject, he bonded with a young prodigy who has a rare and incurable disease, and his strong work there and on other cases led Dr. Pratt to recommend to Dr. Moretti that he be allowed back to ER work. Gates then returned to the ER and began dating a friendly and free-spirited hospital chaplain named Julia, and was asked by Sarah's grandmother to have Sarah move back to Chicago with him because Sarah was starting to rebel against the farm atmosphere much the same as her late mother had. Sarah's grandmother later got angry with him when he wanted her husband to have surgery after a heart episode, though they eventually mended fences and Gates then said they should go with a different option presented by Dr. Morris. Gates and Julia broke up and she went to Nepal on a long spiritual retreat, and he and Samantha Taggart began a sexual relationship which started out with a kiss Samantha gave to Gates. After Gates called Sam for being distant towards him, they began a more mature dating relationship, although they also got caught having sex on a hospital security camera.

On the first day of the ER's new chief Catherine Banfield in Season 15, Tony Gates and the new interns treat a bio-terrorist with a broken leg who accidentally releases a bag of weaponized ricin in the ER. Tony and the interns are forced to remain quarantined in the exam room as Banfield, Archie Morris, Samantha Taggart and Neela Rasgotra help evacuate. After a decontamination, it was revealed the ricin wasn't fine enough to get into an aerosol form and enter their lungs so no infection would occur, much to the relief of Sam who was worried about Tony.

After Alex was involved in a car accident, Tony and Sam's relationship soured until Sam made the decision to move out despite Tony continuously apologizing for letting Alex go out on the night of the accident against Sam's orders. Tony discovered an ER patient's history as a dedicated and wounded Iraq War veteran and was able to get him some help. Tony later slept with intern Daria Wade and regretted it, telling Sam he was sorry about it and gently letting Daria know he was in love with Sam and wanted to fix things between them.

Things between Gates and Sam seem to be improving as they are no longer fighting as much, and both are seen looking at each other whenever they are near.

In the last episode, "And In The End..." Gates gave Sam a refurbished car for her birthday. There was a strong hint that they will be back together.

References

External links 

ER (TV series) characters
Fictional physicians
Fictional paramedics
Television characters introduced in 2005